HMS Anson was a 74-gun third rate ship of the line of the Royal Navy, launched on 11 May 1812 at Hull.

She was placed on harbour service in 1839, carried 499 male convicts to Hobart in 1844, served the next seven years there as a probation ship for female convicts, and was finally broken up there in 1851.

See also
 Brickfields Hiring Depot

Notes

References

Lavery, Brian (2003) The Ship of the Line - Volume 1: The development of the battlefleet 1650-1850. Conway Maritime Press. .

Ships of the line of the Royal Navy
Vengeur-class ships of the line
Ships built on the Humber
1812 ships
Convictism in Tasmania